Amical may refer to:

 AMICAL Consortium, an association of American-style universities outside America
 Amical Club Marie Galante, a football club in Guadeloupe
 Amicale F.C., a football club in Vanuatu